The 1971 All-Big Eight Conference football team consists of American football players chosen by various organizations for All-Big Eight Conference teams for the 1971 NCAA University Division football season.  The selectors for the 1971 season included the Associated Press (AP).

Offensive selections

Tight ends
 John Schroll, Kansas (AP)

Wide receivers
 Johnny Rodgers, Nebraska (AP)

Offensive linemen
 Dick Rupert, Nebraska (AP)
 Ken Jones, Oklahoma (AP)
 Carl Johnson, Nebraska (AP)
 Marion Latimore, Kansas State (AP)

Centers
 Tom Brahaney, Oklahoma (AP)

Backs
 Greg Pruitt, Oklahoma (AP)
 Jack Mildren, Oklahoma (AP)
 Jerry Tagge, Nebraska (AP)
 Jeff Kinney, Nebraska

Defensive selections

Defensive ends
 Willie Harper, Nebraska (AP)
 Ray Hamilton, Oklahoma (AP)

Interior linemen
 Rich Glover, Nebraska (AP)
 Larry Jacobson, Nebraska (AP)
 Herb Orvis, Colorado (AP)
 Derland Moore, Oklahoma (AP

Linebackers
 Steve Aycock, Oklahoma (AP)
 Keith Schroeder, Iowa State (AP)
 Kenney Page, Kansas (AP)

Defensive backs
 Bill Kosch, Nebraska (AP)
 John Shelley, Oklahoma (AP)

Key

AP = Associated Press

See also
 1971 College Football All-America Team

References

All-Big Seven Conference football team
All-Big Eight Conference football teams